Mantas Savėnas (born 27 August 1982) is a former Lithuanian professional footballer who played as a midfielder. He is currently a coach for FK Panevėžys.

Savėnas represented Lithuania at under-21 level before establishing himself as a regular player in the Lithuanian national team.

In the 2005 season Savėnas became Lithuanian A Lyga top scorer with 27 goals and was voted best player in Lithuania, receiving 177 from 200 votes. Following the 2013 season Savenas was voted as the Daugava Rīga best player of the season. In 2014, he was the club's top scorer with 10 goals in 30 appearances.

International goals

References

External links

1982 births
Living people
Lithuanian footballers
Lithuania international footballers
Lithuanian expatriate footballers
Expatriate footballers in Russia
FC Sibir Novosibirsk players
Russian Premier League players
FK Daugava (2003) players
Expatriate footballers in Latvia
Lithuanian expatriate sportspeople in Latvia
Association football midfielders
FC Orenburg players
FC Nosta Novotroitsk players